This page shows the best-selling Christmas singles in the United States. It includes artists from around the world, but it only reflects sales in the United States.  According to the Guinness Book of World Records, "White Christmas" by Bing Crosby is not only the best-selling Christmas/holiday single in the United States, but also the best-selling single of all time, with estimated sales in excess of 50 million copies worldwide.

Prior to March 1, 1991, the only means of tracking sales figures for record albums and singles in the United States was via the certification system of the Recording Industry Association of America (RIAA), based specifically on shipments (less potential returns) on a long-term basis.  From March 1, 1991, through the present day, the Nielsen SoundScan tracking system has been more widely used to accurately track sales of record albums and singles at the point of sale (POS) based on inventory bar code scans, as well as digital music download sales starting in 2003.  As of November 25, 2016, the holiday single with the most digital downloads is Mariah Carey's 1994 track "All I Want for Christmas Is You", which SoundScan estimates as having sold 3,200,000 copies.

Best-selling Christmas/holiday singles by Nielsen SoundScan data

This is a list of the top ten best-selling Christmas singles of the SoundScan era in the United States according to the Nielsen Company, as last updated on November 25, 2016. Nielsen SoundScan began tracking digital download sales data at the end of June 2003.

Best-selling Christmas singles

Best-selling Christmas/holiday singles by RIAA certification
This is an incomplete list of the best-selling Christmas/holiday singles in the United States based on certification by the RIAA.  This list provides a more complete representation of the best-selling Christmas/holiday albums in history, as it includes those released well before the Nielsen/SoundScan era of music sales.

Digital singles

Cellular ringtones

Physical singles
According to the most recent record album certifications, the holiday single title with the highest RIAA certification is Elvis Presley's 1964 single "Blue Christmas", which is certified Platinum by the RIAA (though its date of certification came more than ten years after the RIAA reduced the threshold for Platinum level for singles from two million copies to one million copies).

See also

 Billboard Christmas Holiday Charts
Christmas music
List of Christmas hit singles in the United Kingdom
List of popular Christmas singles in the United States
List of best-selling Christmas albums in the United States
List of Christmas carols

References

United States, Christmas Holiday albums
United States
United States